Tisleidalen Church is a parish church of the Church of Norway in Nord-Aurdal Municipality in Innlandet county, Norway. It is located in the village of Hovda. It is the church for the Tisleidalen parish which is part of the Valdres prosti (deanery) in the Diocese of Hamar. The brown, wooden church was built in a long church design in 1958 using plans drawn up by the architect Karl Stenersen. The church seats about 130 people.

History
Starting in 1929, there was a local initiative to build a chapel in the Tisleidalen area. This initiative was put on hold for many years due to World War II. In 1943, a plot of land in Hovda was donated for the purposes of building a cemetery. The cemetery was consecrated and put into use in 1949. On 29 August 1952, permission was given to build an annex chapel at the cemetery. The chapel was designed by Karl Stenersen. The new "Tisleidalen Chapel" was built in 1957 and consecrated in 1958. It was an annex chapel under the main Aurdal Church. In 1996, the chapel was upgraded to parish church status and it was titled "Tisleidalen Church".

See also
List of churches in Hamar

References

Nord-Aurdal
Churches in Innlandet
Long churches in Norway
Wooden churches in Norway
20th-century Church of Norway church buildings
Churches completed in 1957
1957 establishments in Norway